Bahram Dabiri (born December 15, 1950 in Shiraz, Iran) is an Iranian painter and artist. Dabiri's work has been displayed in many exhibitions in Iran, United States, Spain, Germany and United Arab Emirates.

Academic career 

In 1970, he was accepted into the Fine Arts Department of Tehran University, and received his undergraduate degree in painting.

Exhibitions 

Dabiri's work has been displayed, among others, at Museum of Contemporary Art, Tehran, French Embassy, Tehran, 2000 Art Expo New York, 2000 Contemporary Iranian Modern Art exhibition, New York, Reagan Center, Washington, Fabien Fryns Gallery, Marbella, Spain, Hotel Mirage, UAE, Bernak Gallery, Bremen, Germany.

Influences 

Dabiri's initial influence came by the works of Hieronymus Bosch and Pieter Bruegel the Elder. He studied under Hannibal Alkhas, Behjat Sadr, Parviz Tanavoli and Rouin Pakbaz.

References 

http://www.artebox.ir/v1/index.php/artists/visual-arts/12-bahram-dabiri

1950 births
Living people
Iranian painters
University of Tehran alumni